Per Werenskiold  (born 26 March 1944) is a Norwegian sailor. He was born in Bærum. He competed at the 1968 Summer Olympics in Mexico and 1972 Summer Olympics in Munich.

References

External links 
 

1944 births
Living people
Sportspeople from Bærum
Olympic sailors of Norway
Norwegian male sailors (sport)
Sailors at the 1968 Summer Olympics – Finn
Sailors at the 1972 Summer Olympics – Finn